Gorbovo is a rural locality (a village) in Kichmengksoye Rural Settlement, Kichmengsko-Gorodetsky District, Vologda Oblast, Russia. The population was 34 as of 2002.

Geography 
Gorbovo is located 10 km north of Kichmengsky Gorodok (the district's administrative centre) by road. Nedubrovo is the nearest rural locality.

References 

Rural localities in Kichmengsko-Gorodetsky District